
The Koksoak River is a river in northern Quebec, Canada, the largest river in the Nunavik region.

The name Koksoak is believed to originate from Moravian missionaries who evangelized among the Inuit of the area at the beginning of British rule and incorrectly spelled the Inuktitut word Kuujjuaq, meaning "great river." In the 19th century, the river was also known as Big or South River, taken from South Bay which was the name of Ungava Bay at that time. In 1916, the name Koksoak was officially adopted.

The Koksoak River arises at the confluence of its two main tributaries, the Rivière aux Mélèzes to the west and the Caniapiscau River to the south. However, in 1985 the upper waters of the Canaipiscau River were diverted as part of the James Bay Project and about 45% of the waterflow of the Caniapiscau now flows through the Caniapiscau Reservoir and on into the LaForge and La Grande Rivers to the west.

The Koksoak river has an estimated mean discharge of approximately 55 km3 of water per year - though the absence of long streamgauging records means accurate data are not available. Most of the flow occurs during the early summer when the ice on the river thaws and snow in the Canadian Shield melts. The Koksoak River lies on the boundary between the northern limit of the boreal forest and the vast tundra expanses of the Ungava Peninsula to the north. All the Koksoak basin is covered with permafrost - discontinuous in the south and continuous in the north.

Although hunting activities and administrative services are a mainstay of life in Kuujjuaq, adventure tourism is expanding, centred mostly on caribou hunting as well as salmon, trout and Arctic char fishing.

Tributaries
The significant tributaries of the Koksoak are (in upstream order):
 Highfall Creek
 Kupatalik River
 Ujaralialuk River
 Caniapiscau River
 Forbes River
 Situraviup River
 Andréas River
 Sérigny River
 Swampy bay River
 Rivière aux Mélèzes
 Aigneau River
 Lefebvre River
 Ikirtuuq River
 Rivière du Gué
 Guignas River
 Delay River
 Potier River

See also
List of longest rivers of Canada

References

External links
Nunavik Tourism Association
Kativik Regional Government

Rivers of Nord-du-Québec
Nunavik
Tributaries of Hudson Bay